The Prix Armand-Frappier is an award by the Government of Quebec, part of the Prix du Québec, "given to people who have pursued a research career and have helped build up a research institution. Or it goes to those who have devoted themselves to administering or promoting research and have thereby helped train the next generation of scientists while raising public interest in science and technology". It is named in honour of Armand Frappier.

Winners

References

Extnernal links
 Award winners 

Canadian science and technology awards
Prix du Québec